Duncan Frey Kilmartin (born 1942) is a Republican politician who was elected and currently serves in the Vermont House of Representatives. He represents the Orleans-2 Representative District.

References

1942 births
Living people
Republican Party members of the Vermont House of Representatives
Place of birth missing (living people)
Date of birth missing (living people)